Fazel Ahmad Zekrya (1935–1979), known professionally as Nainawaz (or Ustad Nainawaz) was a renowned Afghan artist, poet and composer. He has composed some of the most iconic pieces in Afghan popular music.

Background
Nainawaz was one of the nine sons of a well known politician, poet, writer Sardar Haji Faiz Muhammad Khan Zikeria from the Barakzai ruling family. He was born in the Yakatoot district of Kabul. Nainwaz attended the elite Lycée Esteqlal in Kabul. In his early teens, he taught himself how to play the accordion. He also wrote poems and composed melodies. His adopted stage name "Nainawaz" means Ney (an End-blown flute) player in Persian. Nainwaz graduated from Kabul University, Law and Political Faculty.

Nainawaz has one son, Amir Khusru Nainawaz, and one daughter Sahar Khanum, married in 1985 to Ehsan Aman a famous singer from Helmand Province.

Career
Nainawaz is credited with adding modern pop elements to Afghan music. He produced countless hit compositions sung by many renowned Afghan artists such as the Ahmad Zahir, Ahmad Wali, Mahwash, Sarban, Awalmir, and many others. Many of his compositions have a Mystical quality and are set to poems by Rumi, Hafez, and Lahuti. Nainawaz was a mentor and teacher to Ahmad Zahir, the well-known Afghan singer.

Death
Nainawaz took part in the Bala Hissar uprising against the Khalq communist regime as a part of the Revolutionary Group of the Peoples of Afghanistan in 1979. He was arrested and executed by the Khalq regime.

References and footnotes

1979 deaths
20th-century Afghan male singers
Pashtun singers
1935 births